is the main railway company operating in the Chūbu (Nagoya) region of central Japan. It is officially abbreviated in English as JR Central and in Japanese as JR Tōkai. Tōkai is a reference to the geographical region in which the company chiefly operates.

JR Central's operational hub is Nagoya Station and the company's administrative headquarters are located in the JR Central Towers above the station. Additionally it is responsible for the Chūō Shinkansen—a maglev service between Tokyo and Osaka, which is due to start operation between Tokyo and Nagoya in 2027.

JR Central is Japan's most profitable and highest throughput high-speed-rail operator, carrying 138 million high-speed-rail passengers in 2009, considerably more than the world's largest airline. Japan recorded a total of 289 million high-speed-rail passengers in 2009.

JR Central is listed in the Tokyo Stock Exchange and Nagoya Stock Exchange with American depositary receipts traded over-the-counter through OTCMG Pink, is a constituent of the TOPIX Core30 index, and is also one of the three only Japan Railways Group constituents of the Nikkei 225 index, the others being JR East and JR West. It is also one of Nagoya's gosanke companies along with Toyota and the Chubu Electric Power Company.

Lines

Shinkansen
Tōkaidō Shinkansen: Tokyo Station—Shin-Ōsaka Station 552.6 km

Conventional lines
 Tōkaidō Main Line: Atami Station—Maibara Station 341.3 km
Branch line: Ōgaki Station—Mino-Akasaka Station 5.0 km
 Gotemba Line: Kōzu Station—Numazu Station 60.2 km
 Minobu Line: Fuji Station—Kōfu Station 88.4 km
 Iida Line: Toyohashi Station—Tatsuno Station 195.7 km
 Taketoyo Line: Ōbu Station—Taketoyo Station 19.3 km
 Chūō Main Line: Shiojiri Station—Nagoya Station 174.8 km
 Takayama Main Line: Gifu Station—Inotani Station 189.2 km
 Taita Line: Tajimi Station—Mino-Ōta Station 17.8 km
 Kansai Main Line: Nagoya Station—Kameyama Station 59.9 km
Kisei Main Line: Kameyama Station—Shingū Station 180.2 km
Meishō Line: Matsusaka Station—Ise-Okitsu Station 43.5 km
Sangū Line: Taki Station—Toba Station 29.1 km
Jōhoku Line: Kachigawa Station—Biwajima Station 11.2 km (trains are operated by Tokai Transport Service Company, not JR Central)

Named train services
 Nanki ( -  & )
 Hida (Nagoya/ - ,  & )
 Shinano (Nagoya -  & )
 Mie (Nagoya -  & )
 Fujikawa ( - )
 Inaji ( - )
 Odoriko / Super Wide View Odoriko ( -  & )
 Sunrise Seto (Tokyo - )
 Sunrise Izumo (Tokyo - )
 Nozomi (Tokyo - )
 Hikari (Tokyo - Hakata & )
 Kodama (Tokyo/ - Shin-Ōsaka, Hakata & Hakataminami)

Affiliates 
The JR Central Group consists of JR Central and the following affiliates:

Transportation
 JR Tokai Bus Company
 JR Tokai Logistics Company (:ja:ジェイアール東海物流株式会社)
 Tokai Transport Service Company
 First Air Transport Co., Ltd. (:ja:ファーストエアートランスポート株式会社)

Merchandise
 JR Tokai Corporation (:ja:ジェイアール東海商事株式会社)
 JR Tokai Takashimaya Co., Ltd. (株式会社:ja:ジェイアール東海高島屋)
 JR-Central Passengers  Co., Ltd. (株式会社:ja:ジェイアール東海パッセンジャーズ)
 JR Tokai Food Service Co., Ltd. (:ja:ジェイアール東海フードサービス株式会社)
 Tokai Kiosk Company (:ja:東海キヨスク株式会社)

Construction
 JR Tokai Construction Co., Ltd. (:ja:ジェイアール東海建設株式会社)
 JR Central Consultants Company (:ja:ジェイアール東海コンサルタンツ株式会社)
 The Nihon Kikai Hosen Co., Ltd (:ja:日本機械保線株式会社)
 Futaba Tetsudo Kogyo Co., Ltd. (:ja:双葉鉄道工業株式会社)
 CN Construction Co., Ltd. (:ja:シーエヌ建設株式会社)

Information systems
 JR Tokai Information Systems Company (:ja:ジェイアール東海情報システム株式会社)
 Shinsei Technos Co., Ltd.(:ja:新生テクノス株式会社)

Hotels and resorts
 JR Tokai Hotels Co., Ltd. (株式会社:ja:ジェイアール東海ホテルズ)
 Nagoya Terminal Hotel Co., Ltd. (:ja:名古屋ターミナルホテル株式会社)
 Shizuoka Terminal Hotel Co., Ltd. (:ja:静岡ターミナルホテル株式会社)

Travel
 JR Tokai Agency Co., Ltd. (株式会社:ja:ジェイアール東海エージェンシー)
 JR Tokai Tours (株式会社:ja:ジェイアール東海ツアーズ)
 Hida Forest City Planning Co., Ltd. (:ja:飛騨森林都市企画株式会社)

Publishing
 Wedge Inc. (株式会社ウェッジ)

Rolling stock
 Shinkansen Engineering Co., Ltd. (:ja:新幹線エンジニアリング株式会社)
 Tokai Rolling Stock & Machinery Co., Ltd. (:ja:東海交通機械株式会社)
 Nippon Sharyo, Ltd

Maintenance
 Chuoh Linen Supply Co., Ltd. (:ja:中央リネンサプライ株式会社)
 JR Tokai General Building Maintenance Co., Ltd. (:ja:ジェイアール東海総合ビルメンテナンス株式会社)
 Central Maintenance Co., Ltd. (:ja:セントラルメンテナンス株式会社)
 Shinkansen Service & Technology Co., Ltd. (株式会社:ja:関西新幹線サービック)
 Shinkansen Maintenance Tokai Co., Ltd. (:ja:新幹線メンテナンス東海株式会社)
 Tokai Seibi Co., Ltd. (:ja:東海整備株式会社)

Real estate
 JR Central Building Co., Ltd. (:ja:ジェイアールセントラルビル株式会社)
 JR Development and Management Corporation of Kansai (:ja:ジェイアール東海関西開発株式会社)
 JR Development and Management Corporation of Shizuoka (:ja:ジェイアール東海静岡開発株式会社)
 JR Tokai Real Estate Co., Ltd. (:ja:ジェイアール東海不動産株式会社)
 Shizuoka Terminal Development Co., Ltd. (:ja:静岡ターミナル開発株式会社)
 Shin-Yokohama Station Development Co., Ltd. (:ja:新横浜ステーション開発株株式会社)
 Tokyo Station Development Co., Ltd. (:ja:東京ステーション開発株式会社)
 Toyohashi Station Building Co., Ltd. (:ja:豊橋ステーションビル株式会社)
 Nagoya Station Area Development Corporation (:ja:名古屋ステーション開発株式会社)
 Nagoya Terminal Station Building Co., Ltd. (:ja:名古屋ターミナルビル株式会社)
 Hamamatsu Terminal Development Co., Ltd. (:ja:浜松ターミナル開発株式会社)

Other services
 JR Tokai Well Co., Ltd. (株式会社:ja:ジェイアール東海ウェル)
 JR Tokai Partners Co., Ltd. (:ja:ジェイアール東海パートナーズ株式会社)

References

External links

Central Japan Railway Company
Central Japan Railway Company| SCMAGLEV Official Website
  Wiki collection of bibliographic works on Central Japan Railway Company

 
Companies listed on the Tokyo Stock Exchange
Railway companies established in 1987
Companies based in Nagoya
Japanese companies established in 1987